Sloboda ili ništa is the seventh studio album by the Serbian garage rock/punk rock band Partibrejkers, released by PGP RTS in 2007.

Track listing 
All lyrics and music written by Zoran Kostić and Nebojša Antonijević.

Personnel 
Partibrejkers
 Nebojša Antonijević "Anton" — guitar, vocals
 Zoran Kostić "Cane" — vocals
 Vladislav Rac — bass
 Dejan Utvar — drums

Additional personnel
 Igor Borojević — producer, featuring [guest]
 Goran Živković — mastered by
 Milan Barković "Bare" — recorded by
 Branislav Petrović "Banana" — featuring [guest]
 Ritch Bitch — featuring [guest]
 Saša Lokner — featuring [guest]
 Vlada Jagodinac — featuring [guest]
 Dušan Kojić "Koja" — featuring [guest]
 Relja Obrenović — featuring [guest]
 Goran Majkić "Goksi" — featuring [guest]
 Gabriel Glid — photography, artwork by [design]

References

External links
 Sloboda ili ništa at Discogs

2007 albums
Partibrejkers albums
PGP-RTS albums